The Green Belt Theory or hypothesis,  is a kind of conspiracy theory  found in Persian sources. It explains the Western world's series of efforts in some countries to regenerate religion in their societies and make a strong preventive belt against the Soviet Union at the time. It supposedly starts with establishing religious schools in India and continues with supporting religious governments in Pakistan in the 1940s. It resulted in the arming of religious groups in Afghanistan, in the 1980s.

Background 
From the nineteenth century, Lord Curzon brought with him a strategy of creating "a Moslem nexus of states" in the Middle East as a shield to ward off Russian expansion. He proposed to take advantage of the situation by putting his British-sponsored Moslem nexus of states into place, When the Bolshevik Revolution brought about Russia's withdrawal from her forward positions. That nexus would have been a line across the Middle East from the Ottoman Empire through the Persian Empire to the khanates and emirates of Central Asia and Afghanistan in the nineteenth century.

References

External links

Conspiracy theories
Belt regions
Iranian Revolution
Clericalism
Geopolitical terminology
Political terminology of Iran